Frazier Hunt (December 1, 1885 – December 24, 1967) was an American radio announcer, writer and war correspondent during World War I and World War II. He wrote several books about his experience during both World Wars as well as historical biographies on famous Americans such as General George Armstrong Custer, Billy the Kid, and Douglas MacArthur.

Biography

He spent his boyhood in Indiana, Chicago and Mexico. He returned to the small mid-western town of Alexis, Illinois to edit the local paper. It was with this background that he came to New York City in 1916 and joined the staff of The Sun. From New York he went to France and from there to Russia where for months he had the Revolution all to himself. In 1919, he smuggled a copy of the Treaty of Versailles, scooping the story. He served as the European editor for Cosmoplitan Magazine, interviewing Vladimir Lenin, Joseph Stalin, and Adolf Hitler. He also traveled to the Far East, covering the Sino-Japanese War.

One of his better-selling books was about his World War I experiences entitled Blown in By the Draft, published by Doubleday in 1918.
During the 1930s, he purchased the ranch "Eden Valley" in southern Alberta, where he met Edward, the Prince of Wales (future Edward VIII), teaching him how to play poker. His Untold Story of General MacArthur was based upon his war correspondence duties as he followed Douglas MacArthur through the Pacific.

As a broadcaster, Hunt presented Frazier Hunt and the News on the CBS Radio Network in the early 1940s.

Hunt has a star on the Hollywood Walk of Fame; he was inducted on February 8, 1960. He died in Newtown, Bucks County, Pennsylvania in 1967.

Other books
"The Tragic Days of Billy the Kid"
The Rising Temper of the East
Sycamore Bend
Custer: The Last of the Cavaliers
Bachelor Prince
One American
Little Doc
The Long Trail from Texas
The Untold Story of Douglas Macarthur
MacArthur and the War Against Japan
Cap Mossman: Last of the Great Cowmen

In collaboration with son Robert Hunt
I Fought with Custer
Horses & Heroes

References

Other sources
 World War I, Adriane Ruggiero, 2003
 Blow in the Draft: Camp Yarns Collected at One of the Great National Army Cantonments by an Amateur War Correspondent, Frazier Hunt, 1918, Doubleday, Page, and Co., pp 372
 The Untold Story of Douglas MacArthur, Frazier Hunt, Devin-Adair Co., 1954
 One American, Frazier Hunt, Simon & Schuster, 1938, "About the author"
 The Batchelor Prince, Frazier Hunt, Harper & Brothers, 1935

External links

1885 births
1967 deaths
American radio personalities
American male non-fiction writers
American war correspondents
American war correspondents of World War II
20th-century American male writers
People from Rock Island, Illinois